Opomydas townsendi is a species of mydas flies (insects in the family Mydidae).

References

Further reading

External links

 Diptera.info

Mydidae
Insects described in 1898